Pterolophia illicita is a species of beetle in the family Cerambycidae. It was described by Francis Polkinghorne Pascoe in 1865. It is known from Sulawesi, Timor, Borneo and Moluccas.

References

illicita
Beetles described in 1865